Natela Georgiyevna Dzalamidze (born 27 February 1993) is a Russian-born Georgian tennis player.

On 16 November 2015, she reached her career-high singles ranking of world No. 245. On 16 May 2022, she peaked at No. 43 in the WTA doubles rankings. Dzalamidze has won three doubles titles on the WTA Tour. She has also won three WTA Challenger doubles titles with 10 singles and 29 doubles titles on the ITF Women's Circuit.

Personal life
She began representing Georgia in international competition in June 2022 in order to be able to compete at Wimbledon and the Olympics.

Professional career
In May 2015, Dzalamidze made her WTA Tour main-draw debut at the 2015 Nürnberger Versicherungscup in Germany, in the doubles draw, partnering Sviatlana Pirazhenka.

In 2021, she won her first and second doubles titles at the Cluj-Napoca Open in Romania, in October 2021 and the Linz Open in Austria, in November 2021, partnering Kaja Juvan and Kamilla Rakhimova, respectively.

Performance timelines

Only main-draw results in WTA Tour, Grand Slam tournaments, Fed Cup/Billie Jean King Cup and Olympic Games are included in win–loss records.

Doubles
Current after the 2023 Merida Open.

WTA career finals

Doubles: 7 (3 titles, 4 runner–ups)

WTA Challenger finals

Doubles: 4 (3 titles, 1 runner–up)

ITF Circuit finals

Singles: 16 (10 titles, 6 runner–ups)

Doubles: 49 (29 titles, 20 runner–ups)

Notes

References

External links
 
 

1993 births
Living people
Russian female tennis players
Female tennis players from Georgia (country)
Russian people of Georgian descent
Tennis players from Moscow